The IS102 RNA is a non-coding RNA that is found in bacteria such as Shigella flexneri and Escherichia coli. The RNA is 208 nucleotides in length and found between the yeeP and flu genes. This RNA was identified in a computational screen of E. coli. The function of this RNA is unknown.

See also 
IS061 RNA
IS128 RNA

References

External links 
 

Non-coding RNA